"Words" is a song by American singer Daya. The song was released on November 15, 2016, as the third single and only non-EP single from her debut studio album, Sit Still, Look Pretty (2016). It was written by Gino Barletta, Melanie Fontana, and Jonas Jeberg, with the production being handled by Barletta.

Release
The song was released along with Sit Still, Look Pretty on October 7, 2016. Before being announced as the third single, it was receiving airplay on the Top 40 radio format. The song was performed at the Macy's Thanksgiving Parade on November 24, 2016.

Critical reception
Neil Z. Yeung of AllMusic said "Honing in on contemporary production trends, "Words" sounds like a tropical-influenced relative of something from Justin Bieber's Purpose or Sia's 'Cheap Thrills'." Buzznet's Tina Roumeliotis stated "'Words' leaves a haunting Banks meets Bieber (believe it or not) feel in the air, making us curious as to what the next album may entail, despite it being way too soon to tell."

Live performances
Daya performed "Words" at the 2016 Macy's Thanksgiving Day Parade.

Charts

Release history

References

2016 singles
2016 songs
Daya (singer) songs
Songs written by Melanie Fontana
Songs written by Jonas Jeberg
Songs written by Gino Barletta